Leo Sheng (born 1996) is a Chinese American actor and activist known for playing Micah Lee on The L Word: Generation Q.

Early life and education 
Sheng was born in Hunan, China and was adopted and raised in Ypsilanti, Michigan by an American lesbian couple. He first came out as trans at age 12.

He received his Bachelor of Science degree in sociology from the University of Michigan in 2017. Sheng was accepted to the school's social work graduate program and planned to enroll, but left because he was cast in his first professional acting role in Adam.

Career 
Sheng first gained attention when he was 17 and used YouTube and Instagram to document his transition. In 2018, he acted in his first lead role in Rhys Ernst's Adam. He also appeared in the documentary Disclosure. He is a lead character on Showtime's The L Word: Generation Q as Micah Lee, who is also a trans man. When he was 11, Sheng watched a clip of a transmasculine character, Max, on the original L Word series and came out as trans shortly after.

Personal life 
Sheng resides in Los Angeles and identifies as a queer trans man.

Filmography

Film

Television

References

External links 
 Official website
 
 
 

Living people
LGBT people from Michigan
Chinese LGBT actors
American LGBT rights activists
Transgender male actors
American LGBT people of Asian descent
University of Michigan alumni
21st-century American actors
American people of Chinese descent
People from Ypsilanti, Michigan
Entertainers from Michigan
1996 births
Chinese adoptees
21st-century Chinese actors
Chinese LGBT rights activists
American LGBT actors